Joyce Taylor (born Joyce Crowder; September 14, 1937) is an American actress. She starred in movies and TV series mostly in the 1950s and 1960s.

Early years
Born in Taylorville, Illinois, she based her stage name on her hometown. A coal miner's daughter, she attended public schools in Taylorville and was the top baton twirler at Taylorville High School. Her performance in a school talent show led to a recording contract.

Career 
Taylor sang in amateur shows at age 10 and turned professional at 15, signing with Mercury Records (billed as Joyce Bradley). When she was 16, she was singing at Chez Paree nightclub in Chicago and other similar venues.

She was under contract to Howard Hughes-owned RKO Pictures in the 1950s but he only allowed her to act in one movie (a small part in Beyond a Reasonable Doubt in 1956). When her seven-year contract ended, she became a regular on the science-fiction adventure TV series Men Into Space (1959–60) and acted in many other TV shows, as well as several feature films.

Personal life
Taylor married a stockbroker, Edward Bellinson.

Selected filmography

Film 
 1956: Beyond a Reasonable Doubt
 1959: The FBI Story
 1961: Atlantis, the Lost Continent
 1961: Ring of Fire
 1962: Beauty and the Beast
 1963: Twice-Told Tales

Television 
 1958: The Real McCoys
 1958: 77 Sunset Strip
 1959: Sea Hunt
 1959: Lawman
 1959: Lock-Up
 1959: The Adventures of Ozzie and Harriet
 1959: The Gale Storm Show
 1959–1960: Men Into Space
 1960: Bat Masterson (S2E21: “Cattle and Canes” as Rancher Jane Taylor)
 1960: The Untouchables
 1960–1962: Tales of Wells Fargo
 1962: Bonanza (Episode: "The War Comes to Washoe" as Morvath Terry)
 1962: Wagon Train
 1964: The Man from U.N.C.L.E.
 1964–1965: The Littlest Hobo

References

External links

1936 births
Living people
20th-century American actresses
Actresses from Illinois
American film actresses
American television actresses
RKO Pictures contract players
People from Taylorville, Illinois
21st-century American women